Bermuda Day is a public holiday in the islands of Bermuda.  It is celebrated on the last Friday in May (previously on 24 May or nearest Monday if that fell on a weekend. From 2018, a decision was made to move it permanently to a Friday).

Bermuda Day is traditionally the first day of the year that residents will go into the sea .  It is also traditionally the first day on which Bermuda shorts are worn as business attire  (although in recent years , Bermuda shorts are increasingly worn at any time of the year) .  Many people also see Bermuda Day as the first day on which they can go out on the water after the winter  — consequently there is always a rush to get one's boat 'in de water' before Bermuda Day .

To celebrate the holiday, there is a parade in Hamilton, Bermuda, and a road race from the west end of the island into Hamilton. For the first time, in 2015, the race started from St George's and into Hamilton. These events are popular with spectators , and residents are known to stake out particular sections of the pavements to enable them to watch the runners and the floats .  Ways of marking out one's family's section can include roping it off (frowned on as people have been hurt walking into them the night before), marking it off with tape with one's name on it, or sleeping there overnight.

References

Bermudian culture
May observances